Agritourism or agrotourism involves any agriculturally based operation or activity that brings visitors to a farm or ranch.

Types
A 2018 article published in the Journal of Agriculture, Food Systems, and Community Development classified agritourism activities as falling into one or more categories: direct-to-consumer sales (e.g., farm stands, u-pick), agricultural education (e.g., school visits to a farm), hospitality (overnight farm stays), recreation (e.g., hunting, horseback riding), and entertainment (e.g., hayrides, harvest dinners). Most agritourists spent time visiting farm stands, picking fruit, or feeding animals; others may navigate a corn maze or do a farm stay, assisting with chores or agricultural or ranch work.

Economic benefits 
Agricultural tourism has become a necessary means for many small farms’ survival. By diversifying business operations, farm operators are able to ensure a more stable income. This is because agritourism activities can occur during times of the year that crops may not be in season, and by providing a completely separate stream of income. Some studies have found that agritourism operations often benefit their surrounding communities by drawing tourists to the area. The economic boost by the increase in traffic can be beneficial to rural areas in need of diversified streams of income.

Agritourism in various countries

Italy
Since 1985 agritourism in Italy is formally regulated by a state law, amended in 2006.

Starting in 2013 Italy has used a sector trademark, “Agriturismo Italia”, accompanied by a new system of classification of farms with accommodation.The trademark, which distinguishes farms regularly operating in accordance with existing laws and regulations, shows a sunflower enclosing a farm.
The classification (from 1 to 5 marks) represents the level of comfort, the variety of services and the quality of the natural environment that each farm is able to offer.
This system was implemented by the Ministry of Agriculture, in cooperation with all regional and national agritourism associations.
The national system thus offers an overall guarantee which still takes account of specific regional characteristics.

United States
Through the Small Farm Center at the University of California, "Agricultural tourism or agritourism, is one alternative for improving the incomes and potential economic viability of small farms and rural communities. Some forms of agritourism enterprises are well developed in California, including fairs and festivals. Other possibilities still offer potential for development". The UC Small Farm Center has developed a California Agritourism Database that "provides visitors and potential entrepreneurs with information about existing agritourism locations throughout the state".

United Kingdom
According to a 2011 article in the journal Tourism Planning and Development, agritourism has become economically important to the agriculture sector in North West England, as farmers seek to diversify their income streams.

Armenia 
The development of agritourism was of high importance in the process of revitalization of rural life in Armenia. Apart from participation in agricultural activities and farming, some more notable activities specific to Armenia are winemaking and carpet weaving.

There are also agricultural festivals and farmer's fairs organized every year, like the "Dolma" festival, "Barbeque (Khorovats)" festival, "Gata" festival, and many more.

India
85% of India's population is directly or indirectly dependent on agriculture and allied activities. Similarly, agriculture accounts for 26% of India's GDP. Maharashtra and Kerala are the states in India that are taking advantage of the potential of agritourism. In Maharashtra Agritourism is promoted by the Agri Tourism Development Corporation. Kuttanad, Wayanad, Palakkad and Idukki are some of the important agricultural areas in Kerala. The 'Green Farm' project launched by the Government of Kerala is aimed at promoting agro-tourism in Kerala. Apart from Kerala and Maharashtra, Nagaland and Sikkim are also successful agri-tourism states.

Pakistan
Pakistan is an agricultural country and agriculture is a vital sector of Pakistan economy, people about 65% live in rural areas and directly or indirectly relating to profession of agriculture. Agriculture of Pakistan accounts 21% of total GDP in the economy. Pakistan have good natural resources for agriculture like  well fertile land, natural flow of water canals from north to south, include dams, barrages, headwork, canals, and distribution channels, four seasons, hard worker peoples, include agro based industries like poultry, fisheries, dairy and livestock. Our agri fields cover with crops round the year. so Agri Tourism / Agro Tourism /Farm Tourism have a great potencial in pakistan for the enpower of Small Farmers. 
Agri Tourism Development Corporation of Pakistan Founder Tariq Tanveer doing work promoting this Agri Tourism Idea inPakistan. brand farmers , Conducts Agri theme harvest festival more than 100 festivals a year to promote this idea.

See also 

 Agricultural show
 Ecotourism
 Enotourism (wine tourism)
 Geotourism
 Guest ranch (dude ranch)
 Rural Ramble
 Rural tourism
 WWOOF (World Wide Opportunities on Organic Farms, or Willing Workers on Organic Farms)
 You-Pick

References

External links

 
 , an online resource developed by the National Children's Center for Rural and Agricultural Health and Safety (NCCRAHS) in 2007.

Agriculture in society
Rural tourism
Types of tourism
Adventure travel